An atom is a particle that consists of a nucleus of protons and neutrons surrounded by a cloud of electrons. The atom is the basic particle of the chemical elements, and the chemical elements are distinguished from each other by the number of protons that are in their atoms. For example, any atom that contains 11 protons is sodium, and any atom that contains 29 protons is copper. The number of neutrons defines the isotope of the element.

Atoms are extremely small, typically around 100 picometers across. A human hair is about a million carbon atoms wide. This is smaller than the shortest wavelength of visible light, which means humans cannot see atoms with conventional microscopes. Atoms are so small that accurately predicting their behavior using classical physics is not possible due to quantum effects.

More than 99.94% of an atom's mass is in the nucleus. The protons have a positive electric charge, the electrons have a negative electric charge, and the neutrons have no electric charge. If the number of protons and electrons are equal, then the atom is electrically neutral. If an atom has more or fewer electrons than protons, then it has an overall negative or positive charge, respectively – such atoms are called ions.

The electrons of an atom are attracted to the protons in an atomic nucleus by the electromagnetic force. The protons and neutrons in the nucleus are attracted to each other by the nuclear force. This force is usually stronger than the electromagnetic force that repels the positively charged protons from one another. Under certain circumstances, the repelling electromagnetic force becomes stronger than the nuclear force. In this case, the nucleus splits and leaves behind different elements. This is a form of nuclear decay.

Atoms can attach to one or more other atoms by chemical bonds to form chemical compounds such as molecules or crystals. The ability of atoms to attach and detach is responsible for most of the physical changes observed in nature. Chemistry is the discipline that studies these changes.

History of atomic theory

In philosophy 

The basic idea that matter is made up of tiny indivisible particles is an old idea that appeared in many ancient cultures. The word atom is derived from the ancient Greek word atomos, which means "uncuttable". This ancient idea was based in philosophical reasoning rather than scientific reasoning. Modern atomic theory is not based on these old concepts. In the early 19th century, the scientist John Dalton noticed that chemical elements seemed to combine with each other by discrete units of weight, and he decided to use the word "atom" to refer to these units, as he thought these were the fundamental units of matter. About a century later it was discovered that Dalton's atoms are not actually indivisible, but the term stuck.

Dalton's law of multiple proportions 

In the early 1800s, the English chemist John Dalton compiled experimental data gathered by himself and other scientists and discovered a pattern now known as the "law of multiple proportions". He noticed that in chemical compounds which contain a particular chemical element, the content of that element in these compounds will differ in weight by ratios of small whole numbers. This pattern suggested that each chemical element combines with other elements by a basic unit of weight, and Dalton decided to call these units "atoms".

For example, there are two types of tin oxide: one is a grey powder that is 88.1% tin and 11.9% oxygen, and the other is a white powder that is 78.7% tin and 21.3% oxygen. Adjusting these figures, in the grey powder there is about 13.5 g of oxygen for every 100 g of tin, and in the white powder there is about 27 g of oxygen for every 100 g of tin. 13.5 and 27 form a ratio of 1:2. Dalton concluded that in these oxides, for every tin atom there are one or two oxygen atoms respectively (SnO and SnO2).

Dalton also analyzed iron oxides. There is one type of iron oxide that is a black powder which is 78.1% iron and 21.9% oxygen; and there is another iron oxide that is a red powder which is 70.4% iron and 29.6% oxygen. Adjusting these figures, in the black powder there is about 28 g of oxygen for every 100 g of iron, and in the red powder there is about 42 g of oxygen for every 100 g of iron. 28 and 42 form a ratio of 2:3. Dalton concluded that in these oxides, for every two atoms of iron, there are two or three atoms of oxygen respectively (Fe2O2 and Fe2O3).

As a final example: nitrous oxide is 63.3% nitrogen and 36.7% oxygen, nitric oxide is 44.05% nitrogen and 55.95% oxygen, and nitrogen dioxide is 29.5% nitrogen and 70.5% oxygen. Adjusting these figures, in nitrous oxide there is 80 g of oxygen for every 140 g of nitrogen, in nitric oxide there is about 160 g of oxygen for every 140 g of nitrogen, and in nitrogen dioxide there is 320 g of oxygen for every 140 g of nitrogen. 80, 160, and 320 form a ratio of 1:2:4. The respective formulas for these oxides are N2O, NO, and NO2.

Isomerism
Scientists discovered some substances have the exact same chemical content but different properties. For instance, in 1827, Friedrich Wöhler discovered that silver fulminate and silver cyanate are both 107 parts silver, 12 parts carbon, 14 parts nitrogen, and 12 parts oxygen (we now know their formulas as both AgCNO). In 1830 Jöns Jacob Berzelius introduced the term isomerism to describe the phenomenon. In 1860, Louis Pasteur hypothesized that the molecules of isomers might have the same composition but different arrangements of their atoms.

In 1874, Jacobus Henricus van 't Hoff proposed that the carbon atom bonds to other atoms in a tetrahedral arrangement. Working from this, he explained the structures of organic molecules in such a way that he could predict how many isomers a compound could have. Consider, for example, pentane (C5H12). In van 't Hoff's way of modelling molecules, there are three possible configurations for pentane, and there really are three different isomers of pentane in nature.

Brownian motion
In 1827, the British botanist Robert Brown observed that dust particles inside pollen grains floating in water constantly jiggled about for no apparent reason. In 1905, Albert Einstein theorized that this Brownian motion was caused by the water molecules continuously knocking the grains about, and developed a mathematical model to describe it. Einstein mathematically calculated the size of atoms and the number of atoms in a mole. This model was validated experimentally in 1908 by French physicist Jean Perrin.

Discovery of the electron 

In 1897, J. J. Thomson discovered that cathode rays are not electromagnetic waves but made of particles because they can be deflected by electrical and magnetic fields. He measured these particles to be 1,800 times lighter than hydrogen (the lightest atom). Thomson concluded that these particles came from the atoms within the cathode — they were subatomic particles. He called these new particles corpuscles but they were later renamed electrons. Thomson also showed that electrons were identical to particles given off by photoelectric and radioactive materials. It was quickly recognized that electrons are the particles that carry electric currents in metal wires. Thomson concluded that these electrons emerged from the very atoms of the cathode in his instruments, which meant that atoms are not indivisible as Dalton thought.

Discovery of the nucleus 

J. J. Thomson thought that the negatively-charged electrons were distributed throughout the atom in a sea of positive charge that was distributed across the whole volume of the atom. This model is sometimes known as the plum pudding model.

Ernest Rutherford and his colleagues Hans Geiger and Ernest Marsden came to doubt the Thomson model after they encountered difficulties when they tried to build an instrument to measure the charge-to-mass ratio of alpha particles (these are positively-charged particles emitted by certain radioactive substances such as radium). The alpha particles were being scattered by the air in the detection chamber, which made the measurements unreliable.  Thomson had encountered a similar problem in his work on cathode rays, which he solved by creating a near-perfect vacuum in his instruments. Rutherford didn't think he'd run into this same problem because alpha particles are much heavier than electrons. According to Thomson's model of the atom, the positive charge in the atom is not concentrated enough to produce an electric field strong enough to deflect an alpha particle, and the electrons are so lightweight they should be pushed aside effortlessly by the much heavier alpha particles. Yet there was scattering, so Rutherford and his colleagues decided to investigate this scattering carefully.

Between 1908 and 1913, Rutherford and his colleagues performed a series of experiments in which they bombarded thin foils of metal with alpha particles. They spotted alpha particles being deflected by angles greater than 90°. To explain this, Rutherford proposed that the positive charge of the atom is not distributed throughout the atom's volume as Thomson believed, but is concentrated in a tiny nucleus at the center. Only such an intense concentration of charge could produce an electric field strong enough to deflect the alpha particles as observed.

Discovery of isotopes 
While experimenting with the products of radioactive decay, in 1913 radiochemist Frederick Soddy discovered that there appeared to be more than one type of atom at each position on the periodic table. The term isotope was coined by Margaret Todd as a suitable name for different atoms that belong to the same element. J. J. Thomson created a technique for isotope separation through his work on ionized gases, which subsequently led to the discovery of stable isotopes.

Bohr model 

In 1913, the physicist Niels Bohr proposed a model in which the electrons of an atom were assumed to orbit the nucleus but could only do so in a finite set of orbits, and could jump between these orbits only in discrete changes of energy corresponding to absorption or radiation of a photon. This quantization was used to explain why the electrons' orbits are stable (given that normally, charges in acceleration, including circular motion, lose kinetic energy which is emitted as electromagnetic radiation, see synchrotron radiation) and why elements absorb and emit electromagnetic radiation in discrete spectra.

Later in the same year Henry Moseley provided additional experimental evidence in favor of Niels Bohr's theory. These results refined Ernest Rutherford's and Antonius van den Broek's model, which proposed that the atom contains in its nucleus a number of positive nuclear charges that is equal to its (atomic) number in the periodic table. Until these experiments, atomic number was not known to be a physical and experimental quantity. That it is equal to the atomic nuclear charge remains the accepted atomic model today.

Chemical bonds between atoms were explained by Gilbert Newton Lewis in 1916, as the interactions between their constituent electrons. As the chemical properties of the elements were known to largely repeat themselves according to the periodic law, in 1919 the American chemist Irving Langmuir suggested that this could be explained if the electrons in an atom were connected or clustered in some manner. Groups of electrons were thought to occupy a set of electron shells about the nucleus.

The Bohr model of the atom was the first complete physical model of the atom. It described the overall structure of the atom, how atoms bond to each other, and predicted the spectral lines of hydrogen. Bohr's model was not perfect and was soon superseded by the more accurate Schrödinger model, but it was sufficient to evaporate any remaining doubts that matter is composed of atoms. For chemists, the idea of the atom had been a useful heuristic tool, but physicists had doubts as to whether matter really is made up of atoms as nobody had yet developed a complete physical model of the atom.

The Schrödinger model 
The Stern–Gerlach experiment of 1922 provided further evidence of the quantum nature of atomic properties. When a beam of silver atoms was passed through a specially shaped magnetic field, the beam was split in a way correlated with the direction of an atom's angular momentum, or spin. As this spin direction is initially random, the beam would be expected to deflect in a random direction. Instead, the beam was split into two directional components, corresponding to the atomic spin being oriented up or down with respect to the magnetic field.

In 1925, Werner Heisenberg published the first consistent mathematical formulation of quantum mechanics (matrix mechanics). One year earlier, Louis de Broglie had proposed the de Broglie hypothesis: that all particles behave like waves to some extent, and in 1926 Erwin Schrödinger used this idea to develop the Schrödinger equation, a mathematical model of the atom (wave mechanics) that described the electrons as three-dimensional waveforms rather than point particles.

A consequence of using waveforms to describe particles is that it is mathematically impossible to obtain precise values for both the position and momentum of a particle at a given point in time. This became known as the uncertainty principle, formulated by Werner Heisenberg in 1927. In this concept, for a given accuracy in measuring a position one could only obtain a range of probable values for momentum, and vice versa.
This model was able to explain observations of atomic behavior that previous models could not, such as certain structural and spectral patterns of atoms larger than hydrogen. Thus, the planetary model of the atom was discarded in favor of one that described atomic orbital zones around the nucleus where a given electron is most likely to be observed.

Discovery of the neutron 
The development of the mass spectrometer allowed the mass of atoms to be measured with increased accuracy. The device uses a magnet to bend the trajectory of a beam of ions, and the amount of deflection is determined by the ratio of an atom's mass to its charge. The chemist Francis William Aston used this instrument to show that isotopes had different masses. The atomic mass of these isotopes varied by integer amounts, called the whole number rule. The explanation for these different isotopes awaited the discovery of the neutron, an uncharged particle with a mass similar to the proton, by the physicist James Chadwick in 1932. Isotopes were then explained as elements with the same number of protons, but different numbers of neutrons within the nucleus.

Fission, high-energy physics and condensed matter 
In 1938, the German chemist Otto Hahn, a student of Rutherford, directed neutrons onto uranium atoms expecting to get transuranium elements. Instead, his chemical experiments showed barium as a product. A year later, Lise Meitner and her nephew Otto Frisch verified that Hahn's result were the first experimental nuclear fission. In 1944, Hahn received the Nobel Prize in Chemistry. Despite Hahn's efforts, the contributions of Meitner and Frisch were not recognized.

In the 1950s, the development of improved particle accelerators and particle detectors allowed scientists to study the impacts of atoms moving at high energies. Neutrons and protons were found to be hadrons, or composites of smaller particles called quarks. The standard model of particle physics was developed that so far has successfully explained the properties of the nucleus in terms of these sub-atomic particles and the forces that govern their interactions.

Structure

Subatomic particles 

Though the word atom originally denoted a particle that cannot be cut into smaller particles, in modern scientific usage the atom is composed of various subatomic particles. The constituent particles of an atom are the electron, the proton and the neutron.

It was the lightest particle with a positive rest mass measured, until the discovery of neutrino mass. Under ordinary conditions, electrons are bound to the positively charged nucleus by the attraction created from opposite electric charges. If an atom has more or fewer electrons than its atomic number, then it becomes respectively negatively or positively charged as a whole; a charged atom is called an ion. Electrons have been known since the late 19th century, mostly thanks to J.J. Thomson; see history of subatomic physics for details.

The number of protons in an atom is called its atomic number. Ernest Rutherford (1919) observed that nitrogen under alpha-particle bombardment ejects what appeared to be hydrogen nuclei. By 1920 he had accepted that the hydrogen nucleus is a distinct particle within the atom and named it proton.

Neutrons are the heaviest of the three constituent particles, but their mass can be reduced by the nuclear binding energy. Neutrons and protons (collectively known as nucleons) have comparable dimensions—on the order of —although the 'surface' of these particles is not sharply defined. The neutron was discovered in 1932 by the English physicist James Chadwick.

In the Standard Model of physics, electrons are truly elementary particles with no internal structure, whereas protons and neutrons are composite particles composed of elementary particles called quarks. There are two types of quarks in atoms, each having a fractional electric charge. Protons are composed of two up quarks (each with charge +) and one down quark (with a charge of −). Neutrons consist of one up quark and two down quarks. This distinction accounts for the difference in mass and charge between the two particles.

The quarks are held together by the strong interaction (or strong force), which is mediated by gluons. The protons and neutrons, in turn, are held to each other in the nucleus by the nuclear force, which is a residuum of the strong force that has somewhat different range-properties (see the article on the nuclear force for more). The gluon is a member of the family of gauge bosons, which are elementary particles that mediate physical forces.

Nucleus 

All the bound protons and neutrons in an atom make up a tiny atomic nucleus, and are collectively called nucleons. The radius of a nucleus is approximately equal to  femtometres, where  is the total number of nucleons. This is much smaller than the radius of the atom, which is on the order of 105 fm. The nucleons are bound together by a short-ranged attractive potential called the residual strong force. At distances smaller than 2.5 fm this force is much more powerful than the electrostatic force that causes positively charged protons to repel each other.

Atoms of the same element have the same number of protons, called the atomic number. Within a single element, the number of neutrons may vary, determining the isotope of that element. The total number of protons and neutrons determine the nuclide. The number of neutrons relative to the protons determines the stability of the nucleus, with certain isotopes undergoing radioactive decay.

The proton, the electron, and the neutron are classified as fermions. Fermions obey the Pauli exclusion principle which prohibits identical fermions, such as multiple protons, from occupying the same quantum state at the same time. Thus, every proton in the nucleus must occupy a quantum state different from all other protons, and the same applies to all neutrons of the nucleus and to all electrons of the electron cloud.

A nucleus that has a different number of protons than neutrons can potentially drop to a lower energy state through a radioactive decay that causes the number of protons and neutrons to more closely match. As a result, atoms with matching numbers of protons and neutrons are more stable against decay, but with increasing atomic number, the mutual repulsion of the protons requires an increasing proportion of neutrons to maintain the stability of the nucleus.

The number of protons and neutrons in the atomic nucleus can be modified, although this can require very high energies because of the strong force. Nuclear fusion occurs when multiple atomic particles join to form a heavier nucleus, such as through the energetic collision of two nuclei. For example, at the core of the Sun protons require energies of 3 to 10 keV to overcome their mutual repulsion—the coulomb barrier—and fuse together into a single nucleus. Nuclear fission is the opposite process, causing a nucleus to split into two smaller nuclei—usually through radioactive decay. The nucleus can also be modified through bombardment by high energy subatomic particles or photons. If this modifies the number of protons in a nucleus, the atom changes to a different chemical element.

This deficit is part of the binding energy of the new nucleus, and it is the non-recoverable loss of the energy that causes the fused particles to remain together in a state that requires this energy to separate.

The fusion of two nuclei that create larger nuclei with lower atomic numbers than iron and nickel—a total nucleon number of about 60—is usually an exothermic process that releases more energy than is required to bring them together. It is this energy-releasing process that makes nuclear fusion in stars a self-sustaining reaction. For heavier nuclei, the binding energy per nucleon in the nucleus begins to decrease. That means fusion processes producing nuclei that have atomic numbers higher than about 26, and atomic masses higher than about 60, is an endothermic process. These more massive nuclei can not undergo an energy-producing fusion reaction that can sustain the hydrostatic equilibrium of a star.

Electron cloud 

The electrons in an atom are attracted to the protons in the nucleus by the electromagnetic force. This force binds the electrons inside an electrostatic potential well surrounding the smaller nucleus, which means that an external source of energy is needed for the electron to escape. The closer an electron is to the nucleus, the greater the attractive force. Hence electrons bound near the center of the potential well require more energy to escape than those at greater separations.

Electrons, like other particles, have properties of both a particle and a wave. The electron cloud is a region inside the potential well where each electron forms a type of three-dimensional standing wave—a wave form that does not move relative to the nucleus. This behavior is defined by an atomic orbital, a mathematical function that characterises the probability that an electron appears to be at a particular location when its position is measured. Only a discrete (or quantized) set of these orbitals exist around the nucleus, as other possible wave patterns rapidly decay into a more stable form. Orbitals can have one or more ring or node structures, and differ from each other in size, shape and orientation.

Each atomic orbital corresponds to a particular energy level of the electron. The electron can change its state to a higher energy level by absorbing a photon with sufficient energy to boost it into the new quantum state. Likewise, through spontaneous emission, an electron in a higher energy state can drop to a lower energy state while radiating the excess energy as a photon. These characteristic energy values, defined by the differences in the energies of the quantum states, are responsible for atomic spectral lines.

The amount of energy needed to remove or add an electron—the electron binding energy—is far less than the binding energy of nucleons. For example, it requires only 13.6 eV to strip a ground-state electron from a hydrogen atom, compared to 2.23 million eV for splitting a deuterium nucleus. Atoms are electrically neutral if they have an equal number of protons and electrons. Atoms that have either a deficit or a surplus of electrons are called ions. Electrons that are farthest from the nucleus may be transferred to other nearby atoms or shared between atoms. By this mechanism, atoms are able to bond into molecules and other types of chemical compounds like ionic and covalent network crystals.

Properties

Nuclear properties 

By definition, any two atoms with an identical number of protons in their nuclei belong to the same chemical element. Atoms with equal numbers of protons but a different number of neutrons are different isotopes of the same element. For example, all hydrogen atoms admit exactly one proton, but isotopes exist with no neutrons (hydrogen-1, by far the most common form, also called protium), one neutron (deuterium), two neutrons (tritium) and more than two neutrons. The known elements form a set of atomic numbers, from the single-proton element hydrogen up to the 118-proton element oganesson. All known isotopes of elements with atomic numbers greater than 82 are radioactive, although the radioactivity of element 83 (bismuth) is so slight as to be practically negligible.

About 339 nuclides occur naturally on Earth, of which 251 (about 74%) have not been observed to decay, and are referred to as "stable isotopes". Only 90 nuclides are stable theoretically, while another 161 (bringing the total to 251) have not been observed to decay, even though in theory it is energetically possible. These are also formally classified as "stable". An additional 35 radioactive nuclides have half-lives longer than 100 million years, and are long-lived enough to have been present since the birth of the Solar System. This collection of 286 nuclides are known as primordial nuclides. Finally, an additional 53 short-lived nuclides are known to occur naturally, as daughter products of primordial nuclide decay (such as radium from uranium), or as products of natural energetic processes on Earth, such as cosmic ray bombardment (for example, carbon-14).

For 80 of the chemical elements, at least one stable isotope exists. As a rule, there is only a handful of stable isotopes for each of these elements, the average being 3.1 stable isotopes per element. Twenty-six "monoisotopic elements" have only a single stable isotope, while the largest number of stable isotopes observed for any element is ten, for the element tin. Elements 43, 61, and all elements numbered 83 or higher have no stable isotopes.

Stability of isotopes is affected by the ratio of protons to neutrons, and also by the presence of certain "magic numbers" of neutrons or protons that represent closed and filled quantum shells. These quantum shells correspond to a set of energy levels within the shell model of the nucleus; filled shells, such as the filled shell of 50 protons for tin, confers unusual stability on the nuclide. Of the 251 known stable nuclides, only four have both an odd number of protons and odd number of neutrons: hydrogen-2 (deuterium), lithium-6, boron-10, and nitrogen-14. (Tantalum-180m is odd-odd and observationally stable, but is predicted to decay with a very long half-life.) Also, only four naturally occurring, radioactive odd-odd nuclides have a half-life over a billion years: potassium-40, vanadium-50, lanthanum-138, and lutetium-176. Most odd-odd nuclei are highly unstable with respect to beta decay, because the decay products are even-even, and are therefore more strongly bound, due to nuclear pairing effects.

Mass 

The large majority of an atom's mass comes from the protons and neutrons that make it up. The total number of these particles (called "nucleons") in a given atom is called the mass number. It is a positive integer and dimensionless (instead of having dimension of mass), because it expresses a count. An example of use of a mass number is "carbon-12," which has 12 nucleons (six protons and six neutrons).

The actual mass of an atom at rest is often expressed in daltons (Da), also called the unified atomic mass unit (u). Hydrogen-1 (the lightest isotope of hydrogen which is also the nuclide with the lowest mass) has an atomic weight of 1.007825 Da. The value of this number is called the atomic mass. A given atom has an atomic mass approximately equal (within 1%) to its mass number times the atomic mass unit (for example the mass of a nitrogen-14 is roughly 14 Da), but this number will not be exactly an integer except (by definition) in the case of carbon-12.

As even the most massive atoms are far too light to work with directly, chemists instead use the unit of moles. One mole of atoms of any element always has the same number of atoms (about ). This number was chosen so that if an element has an atomic mass of 1 u, a mole of atoms of that element has a mass close to one gram. Because of the definition of the unified atomic mass unit, each carbon-12 atom has an atomic mass of exactly 12 Da, and so a mole of carbon-12 atoms weighs exactly 0.012 kg.

Shape and size 

Atoms lack a well-defined outer boundary, so their dimensions are usually described in terms of an atomic radius. This is a measure of the distance out to which the electron cloud extends from the nucleus. This assumes the atom to exhibit a spherical shape, which is only obeyed for atoms in vacuum or free space. Atomic radii may be derived from the distances between two nuclei when the two atoms are joined in a chemical bond. The radius varies with the location of an atom on the atomic chart, the type of chemical bond, the number of neighboring atoms (coordination number) and a quantum mechanical property known as spin. On the periodic table of the elements, atom size tends to increase when moving down columns, but decrease when moving across rows (left to right). Consequently, the smallest atom is helium with a radius of 32 pm, while one of the largest is caesium at 225 pm.

When subjected to external forces, like electrical fields, the shape of an atom may deviate from spherical symmetry. The deformation depends on the field magnitude and the orbital type of outer shell electrons, as shown by group-theoretical considerations. Aspherical deviations might be elicited for instance in crystals, where large crystal-electrical fields may occur at low-symmetry lattice sites. Significant ellipsoidal deformations have been shown to occur for sulfur ions and chalcogen ions in pyrite-type compounds.

Atomic dimensions are thousands of times smaller than the wavelengths of light (400–700 nm) so they cannot be viewed using an optical microscope, although individual atoms can be observed using a scanning tunneling microscope. To visualize the minuteness of the atom, consider that a typical human hair is about 1 million carbon atoms in width. A single drop of water contains about 2 sextillion atoms of oxygen, and twice the number of hydrogen atoms. A single carat diamond with a mass of  contains about 10 sextillion (1022) atoms of carbon. If an apple were magnified to the size of the Earth, then the atoms in the apple would be approximately the size of the original apple.

Radioactive decay 

Every element has one or more isotopes that have unstable nuclei that are subject to radioactive decay, causing the nucleus to emit particles or electromagnetic radiation. Radioactivity can occur when the radius of a nucleus is large compared with the radius of the strong force, which only acts over distances on the order of 1 fm.

The most common forms of radioactive decay are:
 Alpha decay: this process is caused when the nucleus emits an alpha particle, which is a helium nucleus consisting of two protons and two neutrons. The result of the emission is a new element with a lower atomic number.
 Beta decay (and electron capture): these processes are regulated by the weak force, and result from a transformation of a neutron into a proton, or a proton into a neutron. The neutron to proton transition is accompanied by the emission of an electron and an antineutrino, while proton to neutron transition (except in electron capture) causes the emission of a positron and a neutrino. The electron or positron emissions are called beta particles. Beta decay either increases or decreases the atomic number of the nucleus by one. Electron capture is more common than positron emission, because it requires less energy. In this type of decay, an electron is absorbed by the nucleus, rather than a positron emitted from the nucleus. A neutrino is still emitted in this process, and a proton changes to a neutron.
 Gamma decay: this process results from a change in the energy level of the nucleus to a lower state, resulting in the emission of electromagnetic radiation. The excited state of a nucleus which results in gamma emission usually occurs following the emission of an alpha or a beta particle. Thus, gamma decay usually follows alpha or beta decay.

Other more rare types of radioactive decay include ejection of neutrons or protons or clusters of nucleons from a nucleus, or more than one beta particle. An analog of gamma emission which allows excited nuclei to lose energy in a different way, is internal conversion—a process that produces high-speed electrons that are not beta rays, followed by production of high-energy photons that are not gamma rays. A few large nuclei explode into two or more charged fragments of varying masses plus several neutrons, in a decay called spontaneous nuclear fission.

Each radioactive isotope has a characteristic decay time period—the half-life—that is determined by the amount of time needed for half of a sample to decay. This is an exponential decay process that steadily decreases the proportion of the remaining isotope by 50% every half-life. Hence after two half-lives have passed only 25% of the isotope is present, and so forth.

Magnetic moment 

Elementary particles possess an intrinsic quantum mechanical property known as spin. This is analogous to the angular momentum of an object that is spinning around its center of mass, although strictly speaking these particles are believed to be point-like and cannot be said to be rotating. Spin is measured in units of the reduced Planck constant (ħ), with electrons, protons and neutrons all having spin  ħ, or "spin-". In an atom, electrons in motion around the nucleus possess orbital angular momentum in addition to their spin, while the nucleus itself possesses angular momentum due to its nuclear spin.

The magnetic field produced by an atom—its magnetic moment—is determined by these various forms of angular momentum, just as a rotating charged object classically produces a magnetic field, but the most dominant contribution comes from electron spin. Due to the nature of electrons to obey the Pauli exclusion principle, in which no two electrons may be found in the same quantum state, bound electrons pair up with each other, with one member of each pair in a spin up state and the other in the opposite, spin down state. Thus these spins cancel each other out, reducing the total magnetic dipole moment to zero in some atoms with even number of electrons.

In ferromagnetic elements such as iron, cobalt and nickel, an odd number of electrons leads to an unpaired electron and a net overall magnetic moment. The orbitals of neighboring atoms overlap and a lower energy state is achieved when the spins of unpaired electrons are aligned with each other, a spontaneous process known as an exchange interaction. When the magnetic moments of ferromagnetic atoms are lined up, the material can produce a measurable macroscopic field. Paramagnetic materials have atoms with magnetic moments that line up in random directions when no magnetic field is present, but the magnetic moments of the individual atoms line up in the presence of a field.

The nucleus of an atom will have no spin when it has even numbers of both neutrons and protons, but for other cases of odd numbers, the nucleus may have a spin. Normally nuclei with spin are aligned in random directions because of thermal equilibrium, but for certain elements (such as xenon-129) it is possible to polarize a significant proportion of the nuclear spin states so that they are aligned in the same direction—a condition called hyperpolarization. This has important applications in magnetic resonance imaging.

Energy levels 

The potential energy of an electron in an atom is negative relative to when the distance from the nucleus goes to infinity; its dependence on the electron's position reaches the minimum inside the nucleus, roughly in inverse proportion to the distance. In the quantum-mechanical model, a bound electron can occupy only a set of states centered on the nucleus, and each state corresponds to a specific energy level; see time-independent Schrödinger equation for a theoretical explanation. An energy level can be measured by the amount of energy needed to unbind the electron from the atom, and is usually given in units of electronvolts (eV). The lowest energy state of a bound electron is called the ground state, i.e. stationary state, while an electron transition to a higher level results in an excited state. The electron's energy increases along with n because the (average) distance to the nucleus increases.

For an electron to transition between two different states, e.g. ground state to first excited state, it must absorb or emit a photon at an energy matching the difference in the potential energy of those levels, according to the Niels Bohr model, what can be precisely calculated by the Schrödinger equation.
Electrons jump between orbitals in a particle-like fashion. For example, if a single photon strikes the electrons, only a single electron changes states in response to the photon; see Electron properties.

The energy of an emitted photon is proportional to its frequency, so these specific energy levels appear as distinct bands in the electromagnetic spectrum. Each element has a characteristic spectrum that can depend on the nuclear charge, subshells filled by electrons, the electromagnetic interactions between the electrons and other factors.

When a continuous spectrum of energy is passed through a gas or plasma, some of the photons are absorbed by atoms, causing electrons to change their energy level. Those excited electrons that remain bound to their atom spontaneously emit this energy as a photon, traveling in a random direction, and so drop back to lower energy levels. Thus the atoms behave like a filter that forms a series of dark absorption bands in the energy output. (An observer viewing the atoms from a view that does not include the continuous spectrum in the background, instead sees a series of emission lines from the photons emitted by the atoms.) Spectroscopic measurements of the strength and width of atomic spectral lines allow the composition and physical properties of a substance to be determined.

Close examination of the spectral lines reveals that some display a fine structure splitting. This occurs because of spin–orbit coupling, which is an interaction between the spin and motion of the outermost electron. When an atom is in an external magnetic field, spectral lines become split into three or more components; a phenomenon called the Zeeman effect. This is caused by the interaction of the magnetic field with the magnetic moment of the atom and its electrons. Some atoms can have multiple electron configurations with the same energy level, which thus appear as a single spectral line. The interaction of the magnetic field with the atom shifts these electron configurations to slightly different energy levels, resulting in multiple spectral lines. The presence of an external electric field can cause a comparable splitting and shifting of spectral lines by modifying the electron energy levels, a phenomenon called the Stark effect.

If a bound electron is in an excited state, an interacting photon with the proper energy can cause stimulated emission of a photon with a matching energy level. For this to occur, the electron must drop to a lower energy state that has an energy difference matching the energy of the interacting photon. The emitted photon and the interacting photon then move off in parallel and with matching phases. That is, the wave patterns of the two photons are synchronized. This physical property is used to make lasers, which can emit a coherent beam of light energy in a narrow frequency band.

Valence and bonding behavior 

Valency is the combining power of an element. It is determined by the number of bonds it can form to other atoms or groups. The outermost electron shell of an atom in its uncombined state is known as the valence shell, and the electrons in
that shell are called valence electrons. The number of valence electrons determines the bonding
behavior with other atoms. Atoms tend to chemically react with each other in a manner that fills (or empties) their outer valence shells. For example, a transfer of a single electron between atoms is a useful approximation for bonds that form between atoms with one-electron more than a filled shell, and others that are one-electron short of a full shell, such as occurs in the compound sodium chloride and other chemical ionic salts. Many elements display multiple valences, or tendencies to share differing numbers of electrons in different compounds. Thus, chemical bonding between these elements takes many forms of electron-sharing that are more than simple electron transfers. Examples include the element carbon and the organic compounds.

The chemical elements are often displayed in a periodic table that is laid out to display recurring chemical properties, and elements with the same number of valence electrons form a group that is aligned in the same column of the table. (The horizontal rows correspond to the filling of a quantum shell of electrons.) The elements at the far right of the table have their outer shell completely filled with electrons, which results in chemically inert elements known as the noble gases.

States 

Quantities of atoms are found in different states of matter that depend on the physical conditions, such as temperature and pressure. By varying the conditions, materials can transition between solids, liquids, gases and plasmas. Within a state, a material can also exist in different allotropes. An example of this is solid carbon, which can exist as graphite or diamond. Gaseous allotropes exist as well, such as dioxygen and ozone.

At temperatures close to absolute zero, atoms can form a Bose–Einstein condensate, at which point quantum mechanical effects, which are normally only observed at the atomic scale, become apparent on a macroscopic scale. This super-cooled collection of atoms
then behaves as a single super atom, which may allow fundamental checks of quantum mechanical behavior.

Identification 

While atoms are too small to be seen, devices such as the scanning tunneling microscope (STM) enable their visualization at the surfaces of solids. The microscope uses the quantum tunneling phenomenon, which allows particles to pass through a barrier that would be insurmountable in the classical perspective. Electrons tunnel through the vacuum between two biased electrodes, providing a tunneling current that is exponentially dependent on their separation. One electrode is a sharp tip ideally ending with a single atom. At each point of the scan of the surface the tip's height is adjusted so as to keep the tunneling current at a set value. How much the tip moves to and away from the surface is interpreted as the height profile. For low bias, the microscope images the averaged electron orbitals across closely packed energy levels—the local density of the electronic states near the Fermi level. Because of the distances involved, both electrodes need to be extremely stable; only then periodicities can be observed that correspond to individual atoms. The method alone is not chemically specific, and cannot identify the atomic species present at the surface.

Atoms can be easily identified by their mass. If an atom is ionized by removing one of its electrons, its trajectory when it passes through a magnetic field will bend. The radius by which the trajectory of a moving ion is turned by the magnetic field is determined by the mass of the atom. The mass spectrometer uses this principle to measure the mass-to-charge ratio of ions. If a sample contains multiple isotopes, the mass spectrometer can determine the proportion of each isotope in the sample by measuring the intensity of the different beams of ions. Techniques to vaporize atoms include inductively coupled plasma atomic emission spectroscopy and inductively coupled plasma mass spectrometry, both of which use a plasma to vaporize samples for analysis.

The atom-probe tomograph has sub-nanometer resolution in 3-D and can chemically identify individual atoms using time-of-flight mass spectrometry.

Electron emission techniques such as X-ray photoelectron spectroscopy (XPS) and Auger electron spectroscopy (AES), which measure the binding energies of the core electrons, are used to identify the atomic species present in a sample in a non-destructive way. With proper focusing both can be made area-specific. Another such method is electron energy loss spectroscopy (EELS), which measures the energy loss of an electron beam within a transmission electron microscope when it interacts with a portion of a sample.

Spectra of excited states can be used to analyze the atomic composition of distant stars. Specific light wavelengths contained in the observed light from stars can be separated out and related to the quantized transitions in free gas atoms. These colors can be replicated using a gas-discharge lamp containing the same element. Helium was discovered in this way in the spectrum of the Sun 23 years before it was found on Earth.

Origin and current state 
Baryonic matter forms about 4% of the total energy density of the observable universe, with an average density of about 0.25 particles/m3 (mostly protons and electrons). Within a galaxy such as the Milky Way, particles have a much higher concentration, with the density of matter in the interstellar medium (ISM) ranging from 105 to 109 atoms/m3. The Sun is believed to be inside the Local Bubble, so the density in the solar neighborhood is only about 103 atoms/m3. Stars form from dense clouds in the ISM, and the evolutionary processes of stars result in the steady enrichment of the ISM with elements more massive than hydrogen and helium.

Up to 95% of the Milky Way's baryonic matter are concentrated inside stars, where conditions are unfavorable for atomic matter. The total baryonic mass is about 10% of the mass of the galaxy; the remainder of the mass is an unknown dark matter. High temperature inside stars makes most "atoms" fully ionized, that is, separates all electrons from the nuclei. In stellar remnants—with exception of their surface layers—an immense pressure make electron shells impossible.

Formation 

Electrons are thought to exist in the Universe since early stages of the Big Bang. Atomic nuclei forms in nucleosynthesis reactions. In about three minutes Big Bang nucleosynthesis produced most of the helium, lithium, and deuterium in the Universe, and perhaps some of the beryllium and boron.

Ubiquitousness and stability of atoms relies on their binding energy, which means that an atom has a lower energy than an unbound system of the nucleus and electrons. Where the temperature is much higher than ionization potential, the matter exists in the form of plasma—a gas of positively charged ions (possibly, bare nuclei) and electrons. When the temperature drops below the ionization potential, atoms become statistically favorable. Atoms (complete with bound electrons) became to dominate over charged particles 380,000 years after the Big Bang—an epoch called recombination, when the expanding Universe cooled enough to allow electrons to become attached to nuclei.

Since the Big Bang, which produced no carbon or heavier elements, atomic nuclei have been combined in stars through the process of nuclear fusion to produce more of the element helium, and (via the triple alpha process) the sequence of elements from carbon up to iron; see stellar nucleosynthesis for details.

Isotopes such as lithium-6, as well as some beryllium and boron are generated in space through cosmic ray spallation. This occurs when a high-energy proton strikes an atomic nucleus, causing large numbers of nucleons to be ejected.

Elements heavier than iron were produced in supernovae and colliding neutron stars through the r-process, and in AGB stars through the s-process, both of which involve the capture of neutrons by atomic nuclei. Elements such as lead formed largely through the radioactive decay of heavier elements.

Earth 
Most of the atoms that make up the Earth and its inhabitants were present in their current form in the nebula that collapsed out of a molecular cloud to form the Solar System. The rest are the result of radioactive decay, and their relative proportion can be used to determine the age of the Earth through radiometric dating. Most of the helium in the crust of the Earth (about 99% of the helium from gas wells, as shown by its lower abundance of helium-3) is a product of alpha decay.

There are a few trace atoms on Earth that were not present at the beginning (i.e., not "primordial"), nor are results of radioactive decay. Carbon-14 is continuously generated by cosmic rays in the atmosphere. Some atoms on Earth have been artificially generated either deliberately or as by-products of nuclear reactors or explosions. Of the transuranic elements—those with atomic numbers greater than 92—only plutonium and neptunium occur naturally on Earth. Transuranic elements have radioactive lifetimes shorter than the current age of the Earth and thus identifiable quantities of these elements have long since decayed, with the exception of traces of plutonium-244 possibly deposited by cosmic dust. Natural deposits of plutonium and neptunium are produced by neutron capture in uranium ore.

The Earth contains approximately  atoms. Although small numbers of independent atoms of noble gases exist, such as argon, neon, and helium, 99% of the atmosphere is bound in the form of molecules, including carbon dioxide and diatomic oxygen and nitrogen. At the surface of the Earth, an overwhelming majority of atoms combine to form various compounds, including water, salt, silicates and oxides. Atoms can also combine to create materials that do not consist of discrete molecules, including crystals and liquid or solid metals. This atomic matter forms networked arrangements that lack the particular type of small-scale interrupted order associated with molecular matter.

Rare and theoretical forms

Superheavy elements 

All nuclides with atomic numbers higher than 82 (lead) are known to be radioactive. No nuclide with an atomic number exceeding 92 (uranium) exists on Earth as a primordial nuclide, and heavier elements generally have shorter half-lives. Nevertheless, an "island of stability" encompassing relatively long-lived isotopes of superheavy elements with atomic numbers 110 to 114 might exist. Predictions for the half-life of the most stable nuclide on the island range from a few minutes to millions of years. In any case, superheavy elements (with Z > 104) would not exist due to increasing Coulomb repulsion (which results in spontaneous fission with increasingly short half-lives) in the absence of any stabilizing effects.

Exotic matter 

Each particle of matter has a corresponding antimatter particle with the opposite electrical charge. Thus, the positron is a positively charged antielectron and the antiproton is a negatively charged equivalent of a proton. When a matter and corresponding antimatter particle meet, they annihilate each other. Because of this, along with an imbalance between the number of matter and antimatter particles, the latter are rare in the universe. The first causes of this imbalance are not yet fully understood, although theories of baryogenesis may offer an explanation. As a result, no antimatter atoms have been discovered in nature. In 1996, the antimatter counterpart of the hydrogen atom (antihydrogen) was synthesized at the CERN laboratory in Geneva.

Other exotic atoms have been created by replacing one of the protons, neutrons or electrons with other particles that have the same charge. For example, an electron can be replaced by a more massive muon, forming a muonic atom. These types of atoms can be used to test fundamental predictions of physics.

See also

Notes

References

Bibliography

Further reading

External links 

 
 

 
Chemistry
Articles containing video clips